Merindad is a Mediaeval Spanish administrative term for a country subdivision smaller than a province but larger than a municipality.  The officer in charge of a merindad was called a merino, roughly equivalent to the English count or bailiff.

It was used in the kingdoms of Castile and Navarre.
Connected to the birth of Castile, the Merindades, standing for a northernmost comarca of the province of Burgos, was part of the creation of the administrative division by King Peter.

Currently, the Foral Community of Navarre is still divided into five merindades standing for different judicial districts. The historic Merindad de Ultrapuertos lying to the north of the Pyrenees is nowadays Lower Navarre. 

Administratively, they have been substituted by the partido judicial.
In Biscay, the mancomunidades comarcales keep the place of the old merindades, such as Duranguesado.

See also
 Partidos of Buenos Aires, a second-level administrative subdivision
 Partidos of Chile in Colonial Chile, a second-level administrative subdivision

Spanish words and phrases
Types of administrative division